Ingeborg Gerdes (1938 – 20 June 2020) was a German-American photographer.

Early life and education
Born in Merseburg, Germany in 1938, she earned a degree in economics from Heidelberg University in 1968. She received an MFA degree from the San Francisco Art Institute in 1970.

Career
Gerdes began taking photos in the mid 1960s when she had come to the United States with her husband Hartmut Gerdes. She is said to have arrived in San Francisco after a road trip with a bag full of exposed film. Installed in San Francisco, she began to photograph the neighborhoods of Russian Hill and Golden Gate Fields. Within five years of her 1970 graduation from the San Francisco Art Institute, Gerdes was part of the exhibition “Women Photographers: A Historical Survey” at the San Francisco Museum of Modern Art.

Gerdes died on June 20, 2020 in Emeryville, California.

Collections
Cantor Arts Center
Harvard Art Museums
Norton Simon Museum
Oakland Museum
Portland Art Museum
San Francisco Museum of Modern Art
Smithsonian American Art Museum 
Museum of Modern Art, New York

References

1938 births
2020 deaths
20th-century German women artists
21st-century German women artists
20th-century German photographers
21st-century German photographers